Darnell Falls is a waterfall located in the Chattahoochee National Forest in Rabun County, Georgia that cascades for over 30 feet.  There is a short hiking trail that provides access to the falls

Waterfalls of Georgia (U.S. state)
Protected areas of Rabun County, Georgia
Chattahoochee-Oconee National Forest
Waterfalls of Rabun County, Georgia